"Land" was a one-off charity single credited to Midnight Oil, Daniel Lanois, Hothouse Flowers, Crash Vegas, and The Tragically Hip. Recorded in 1993 and released in Canada in 1994, on Cargo Records and in Australia in January 1995 on Columbia Records.

All five artists were part of the 1993's Another Roadside Attraction tour.

The song protests the logging industry practice of clearcutting in the rainforests of British Columbia, particularly in Clayoquot Sound.

Tracklisting
 "Introduction" - 0:34
 "Land" (Single Version) - 5:39
 "Land" (Full Length Version) - 6:16

Charts

References

1994 singles
Charity singles
All-star recordings
The Tragically Hip songs
Midnight Oil songs
Protest songs
Songs written by Daniel Lanois
1993 songs
Songs written by Gord Downie
Song recordings produced by Daniel Lanois
Songs written by Peter Garrett